Eataly is a chain of large format/footprint Italian marketplaces (food halls) comprising a variety of restaurants, food and beverage counters, bakery, retail items, and a cooking school. Eataly was founded by Oscar Farinetti, an entrepreneur formerly involved in the consumer electronics business, and collaborates with Slow Food. Since 1 October 2016, Eataly has been led by Andrea Guerra, the executive chairman.

Origin

In January 2007, Italian businessman Oscar Farinetti opened the first location of Eataly, converting a closed vermouth factory in the Lingotto district of Turin. Easily accessible via the Lingotto metro station, the establishment has been described by  The New York Times as a "megastore" that "combines elements of a bustling European open market, a Whole-Foods-style supermarket, a high-end food court and a New Age learning center." Farinetti planned early on that additional stores would open elsewhere in Italy and in New York.

Expansion
The first Eataly location in New York City is located in the Toy Center Building near Madison Square Park. Mayor Michael Bloomberg attended the opening, praising Eataly for creating 300 new jobs. Two weeks after opening, there were still lines extending down Fifth Avenue to get into the store. The New York Eataly was originally planned for a smaller space near Rockefeller Center.

The chain has additional locations in Italy and a few in Tokyo. In 2012 Eataly opened in Rome its largest megastore, in the abandoned Air Terminal building near Ostiense Station. There is an Eataly at Rome's Fiumicino airport, and in the Porto Antico area in Genoa.

In January 2013, Eataly announced a partnership with MSC Cruises to open two restaurants on MSC Preziosa. Eataly was also added to MSC Divina.

On December 2, 2013, Eataly opened a new location at 43 E. Ohio St. in Chicago, on a 63,000-square-foot retail space, making it the largest Eataly in the US. The cost of the Chicago venture is estimated at $20 million. On March 18, 2014, Eataly opened its big 5,000 sqm store in Piazza XXV Aprile in Milan.

The founder Oscar Farinetti received the America Award of the Italy-USA Foundation in 2013. On December 16, 2014, Eataly opened the first store at Zorlu Center in Istanbul. On May 19, 2015, Eataly opened its first store in the southern hemisphere in São Paulo. On November 26, 2015, Eataly opened in Munich, making it the first location in Germany.

In June 2016, it was announced that an Eataly location would open in 2018 at the Park MGM casino in Las Vegas (formerly the Monte Carlo). Eataly will fill approximately 40,000 square feet on the southern edge of the resort and The Park-facing side will become the main pedestrian entrance into the Park MGM casino.

In July 2016, Eataly announced a downtown New York City location at the World Trade Center.

In November 2016, a 45,000-square-foot Eataly location opened in the Boston Prudential Center, replacing an existing food court after extensive renovations.

In October 2017 Eataly Century City location opened at the newly remodeled $1-billion Westfield Century City Mall in Los Angeles County. Covering 67,000 square feet, Eataly L.A. surpassed Eataly Chicago to become the largest Eataly in the United States.

On February 17, 2018, Eataly opened its 40th location in Stockholm, Sweden. The operation occupies 32,300 square feet in a former movie theater in the heart of Stockholm's shopping district.

In April 2019, Eataly opened its first location in Paris, France. It is located in the center of the French capital in the Marais neighborough, between the Place des Émeutes-de-Stonewall (Stonewall Riots square) and the rue Sainte-Croix-de-la-Bretonnerie, in Le Marais (4th arrondissement).

On November 13, 2019, Eataly opened a 50,000-square-foot store in Toronto, Canada in the Manulife Centre on Bloor Street.

In September 2022, the UK investment firm Investindustrial VII LP became Eataly's main shareholder by acquiring 52% of its shares for 200 million euros.

Name
The name Eataly was coined by Celestino Ciocca, a brand strategy consultant who has worked for Texas Instruments as well as Ernst & Young. He first registered Eataly as a domain name on February 23, 2000, and as a trademark in June 2000. Ciocca sold (by his family company) all his rights to the name to Natale Farinetti on February 3, 2004, by public deed repertorio n° 96538 – raccolta n° 11510. Other than the obvious portmanteau of 'Eat' and 'Italy', the 'aly' part of the name is suggestive of an alley, with many food stalls.

Controversy
Mario Batali, previously involved with Eataly, is no longer attached to the company following his sexual misconduct allegations. Eataly pulled all products bearing his likeness two days after the allegations surfaced in 2017.

Brand stores

The Eataly store in Las Vegas' Park MGM is owned by MGM Resorts International.

Other planned stores include locations in Abu Dhabi, Brussels, Hong Kong, Johannesburg, Lausanne, London, Mexico City, Philadelphia, Rio de Janeiro, Singapore, Sydney, and Washington, DC.

References

External links
 "Exploring Eataly" (slide show), and map, The New York Times (October 19, 2010), Celestino Ciocca – Eataly
 Eataly: Contemporary Italian Cooking. Phaidon Press, 2016. .
 Dario Bressanini, Italy a New York Le Scienze

Economy of New York City
2010 establishments in New York City
Italian-American cuisine
Supermarkets of Italy
Retail companies established in 2010
Food halls